José Luiz Datena (born 19 May 1957), known mononymously as Datena, is a Brazilian journalist and TV presenter, who currently hosts the news program Brasil Urgente at Rede Bandeirantes. Brasil Urgente mostly deals with urban violence and crime in various regions of Brazil, often covering and commenting on homicides and crime in general. He started his career in radio before becoming a television presenter on a sports show, and later moving on to the show he currently hosts on Rede Bandeirantes.

References

External links
 
 

1957 births
Living people
People from Ribeirão Preto
Brazilian journalists
Male journalists
Brazilian people of Italian descent
Brazilian television presenters

Workers' Party (Brazil) politicians
Progressistas politicians
Democrats (Brazil) politicians
Brazilian Democratic Movement politicians
Social Liberal Party (Brazil) politicians
Brazil Union politicians
Social Christian Party (Brazil) politicians